Ferguson is a home rule-class city just south of downtown Somerset in Pulaski County, Kentucky, United States. It had a population of 924 as of the 2010 census, up from 881 in 2000.

History
The city was originally constructed just north of the Cincinnati Southern Railroad's engine repair shops as a residential community for its workers. It was incorporated by the state assembly in 1906. It was likely named for the Cincinnati attorney Edward A. Ferguson who helped found the railroad in 1869.

Because another community in Logan County already possessed a post office named Ferguson, the city long employed the name Luretha for mail delivery after the daughter of its first postmaster George Wynn. In 1950, the Logan Co. post office was closed and the Board on Geographic Names approved the use of Ferguson for the Pulaski community's mail.

The railroad shops were specialized for work with steam engines and were shuttered after trains began using diesel locomotives in the mid-20th century.

Ferguson School
Ferguson School opened in 1910 for grades 1-12 to serve the children of the town and the rural area just south and east. The high school fluctuated in enrollment from 100 to 150. The high school closed in 1968 and the elementary school in 1978. The property of the former school grounds is now the Ferguson Park, and the buildings house community center offices and recreational facilities. Ferguson students now attend Southwestern-Pulaski County High School.

Geography
Ferguson is located at  (37.066845, -84.599953).  The city is concentrated along Kentucky Route 1247 (Murphy Avenue), and stretches southward toward Kentucky Route 914.  Ferguson is surrounded on the north, west, and south by the municipal boundaries of Somerset.  The Cumberland River (Lake Cumberland) passes to the southwest.

Demographics

As of the census of 2000, there were 881 people, 360 households, and 249 families residing in the city. The racial makeup of the city was 97.62% White, 1.02% African American, 0.34% Native American, 0.45% Asian, and 0.57% from two or more races. Hispanic or Latino of any race were 0.23% of the population.

There were 360 households, out of which 27.8% had children under the age of 18 living with them, 56.4% were married couples living together, 10.0% had a female householder with no husband present, and 30.8% were non-families. 26.1% of all households were made up of individuals, and 11.7% had someone living alone who was 65 years of age or older. The average household size was 2.45 and the average family size was 2.92.

In the city, the population was spread out, with 22.9% under the age of 18, 10.8% from 18 to 24, 27.8% from 25 to 44, 24.9% from 45 to 64, and 13.6% who were 65 years of age or older. The median age was 38 years. For every 100 females, there were 105.8 males. For every 100 females age 18 and over, there were 94.0 males.

The median income for a household in the city was $30,855, and the median income for a family was $37,841. Males had a median income of $27,386 versus $17,308 for females. The per capita income for the city was $13,355. About 10.0% of families and 16.5% of the population were below the poverty line, including 22.4% of those under age 18 and 14.0% of those age 65 or over.

References

External links
 Lake Cumberland Area Guide
 

Cities in Kentucky
Cities in Pulaski County, Kentucky